Stanisław Potrzebowski (born 9 February 1937) is the founder and Naczelnik (leader) of Rodzima Wiara, a Polish rodnover organisation, and of the European Congress of Ethnic Religions.

Career 
Between 1954-1957 Potrzebowski was studying geology at the AGH University of Science and Technology. In 1957, he was arrested and interrogated by Służba Bezpieczeństwa for distributing leaflets against closing of the student's magazine "Po Prostu". From 1958 to 1966 he was serving in the Polish air forces; he was left army with the poruchnik rank. In 1972, he finished his studies with honors and received a master's degree of history at University of Wrocław.

In 1973, Potrzebowski went to West Germany and started studies at University of Mainz. In 1980 he received the title of PhD in philosophy. In 1985 he went to South Africa, where he was working e.g. in Deutsche Schule in Pretoria. In 1991 he returned to Poland and lives in Wrocław. Stanisław Potrzebowski continue his research at this filed. He is also giving public lectures.

Publications

References 

1937 births
Living people
Polish clergy
Polish modern pagans
Founders of modern pagan movements
University of Wrocław alumni
Johannes Gutenberg University Mainz alumni